The Mighty Ducks (also known as D1: The Mighty Ducks and in the UK and Australia as Champions) is a 1992 American sports comedy-drama film about a youth league hockey team, directed by Stephen Herek and starring Emilio Estevez. It was produced by The Kerner Entertainment Company and Avnet–Kerner Productions and distributed by Walt Disney Pictures. It is the first film in The Mighty Ducks film series. In some countries, the home release copies were printed with the title as The Mighty Ducks Are the Champions to avoid confusion with the title of the sequel.

The year after the film's release, Disney founded an NHL hockey team, named the "Mighty Ducks of Anaheim" after the film.

Plot
Gordon Bombay (Emilio Estevez) is a successful but arrogant Minneapolis defense attorney. After his 30th successful case, he celebrates by going out drinking, but is arrested for drunk driving and sentenced to 500 hours of community service by coaching the local "District 5" Pee-Wee hockey team. Bombay has an unpleasant history with the sport: as a youth in 1973, he was the Hawks’ star player but, struggling with the loss of his father, he missed a penalty shot in the championship game, disappointing his hyper-competitive coach, Jack Reilly (Lane Smith). The Hawks went on to lose in overtime, becoming one of their only championship defeats.

Bombay meets the District 5 team, and realizes the children have no practice facility, equipment, or ability. Their first game with Bombay at the helm is against the Hawks. Reilly is still the Hawks' head coach and, despite a nearly unbroken championship streak, remains bitter about Gordon's missed penalty shot. District 5 is soundly defeated as Reilly demands the Hawks run up the score. Bombay berates the team for not listening to him, and the players challenge his authority. For the next match, Bombay tries to teach his team how to dive and draw penalties, which results in another loss – this time to the Jets – angering the team further. Specifically one player Charlie Conway  (Joshua Jackson), who refused to fake an injury like Bombay instructed him to.  Bombay visits his old mentor Hans (Joss Ackland), who owns a nearby sporting goods store and was in attendance at the game against the Hawks. While there, Bombay recalls that he quit playing hockey after losing his father four months before the championship game, and because Reilly blamed him for the loss due to the missed penalty shot. Hans encourages him to rekindle his childhood passion for the sport by skating in a frozen pond like he did when he was a kid.  Realizing the error of his ways, he apologizes to Charlie and his mother at their home.

Bombay approaches his boss, Gerald Ducksworth (Josef Sommer), to sponsor the team, allowing them to purchase professional-grade equipment as opposed to the makeshift "tape-to-your-shins" they had, and give Bombay time to teach the players fundamentals. Renamed the Ducks – after Ducksworth – the team fights its next game against the Cardinals to a tie. They recruit three new players: Figure skating siblings Tommy (Danny Tamberelli) and Tammy Duncan (Jane Plank), and slap shot specialist and enforcer Fulton Reed (Elden Henson). The potential of Charlie catches Bombay's eye; he takes Charlie under his wing and teaches him some of the tactics he used playing with the Hawks.

Bombay learns that, due to redistricting, the Hawks’ star player Adam Banks (Vincent LaRusso) lives in District Five and should be playing for the Ducks, and threatens Reilly into transferring Banks to the Ducks. After overhearing an out-of-context quote about the team, most of the players walk out (except Charlie and Fulton who form a strong friendship), resulting in a loss on forfeit to the Flames. The Ducks lose faith in Bombay and revert to their old habits except Charlie and Fulton.

Ducksworth makes a deal with Reilly for the Hawks to keep Banks, which Bombay, although initially tempted, refuses on the principles of fair play, which Ducksworth berated him about when he started his community service. Left with the choice of letting his team down or being fired from his job, he takes the latter.

Bombay manages to regain his players’ trust after they win a crucial match against the Huskies in order to qualify for the playoffs, and Banks – who decided to play with the Ducks rather than not play hockey at all – proves to be an asset though Jesse doesn’t trust him. The Ducks march through the playoffs with wins against the Hornets and the Cardinals, reaching the championship game against the Hawks. Reilly orders his team to injure Banks to force him out of the game; in spite of this, the Ducks manage to tie late in the final period, and Charlie is tripped by a Hawks player as time expires. In precisely the same situation Bombay faced in his youth, Charlie prepares for a game-deciding penalty shot. In stark contrast to Reilly – who told Bombay that if he missed, he was letting everyone down – Bombay tells Charlie to take his best shot and that he will believe in him no matter what. Inspired, Charlie fakes out the goalie with a "triple-deke" Bombay taught him and scores, winning the state championship.

The Ducks players and their families race onto the ice in jubilation, where Bombay thanks Hans for his belief in him and Hans tells Bombay he is proud of him; as Gordon is handed and raises the championship trophy, the team all rally around him and chant "Ducks!" repeatedly in triumphant unison. Some days later, Bombay boards a bus to a minor-league tryout, secured for him by the NHL's Basil McRae of the Minnesota North Stars, who played Pee-Wee hockey with him as a youth. Although daunted at the prospect of going up against younger players, he receives the same words of encouragement and advice from the Ducks he had given them, promising to return next season to defend their title.

Cast

Production
The film was written by Steve Brill, who later sued for royalties for the film. Jake Gyllenhaal turned down the role of Charlie Conway. Emilio Estevez was cast in 1991, after Herek was impressed by his performances in Brat Pack films, The Outsiders (1983), The Breakfast Club (1985) and St. Elmo's Fire (1985).

It was filmed in several locations in Minneapolis, Minnesota.

Reception

Box office 
The film grossed $50,752,337 in the United States and Canada, becoming a surprising success with audiences, which in turn inspired two sequels and an animated TV series (the latter taking on a science fiction angle with actual anthropomorphic ducks). While neither sequel's box-office total matched that of the first movie, they were still financially successful. The Mighty Ducks made $54 million in home video rentals according to Video Week magazine in 1992.

Critical reception 
The Mighty Ducks received generally lukewarm reviews from critics. It holds a 23% approval rating on Rotten Tomatoes, based on 30 reviews, with an average rating of 4/10. The site's consensus reads, "The Mighty Ducks has feel-good goals, but only scores a penalty shot for predictability". Audiences polled by CinemaScore gave the film an average grade of "A" on an A+ to F scale.

Roger Ebert said the film was "sweet and innocent, and that at a certain level it might appeal to younger kids. I doubt if its ambitions reach much beyond that", and gave it a 2-star rating. Rita Kempley of The Washington Post described the film as 'Steven Brill, who has a small role in the film, constructed the screenplay much as one would put together some of those particleboard bookcases from Ikea.'

Emilio Estevez was surprised at the popularity of the movie series.

Accolades

The film is recognized by American Film Institute in these lists:
 2006: AFI's 100 Years...100 Cheers – Nominated
 2008: AFI's 10 Top 10:
 Nominated Sports Film

Home media
The film was released on VHS on April 14, 1993, DVD on April 11, 2000, and on Blu-ray Disc on May 23, 2017.

See also
 The Bad News Bears, an earlier film with a similar premise.

References

External links

 
 
 
 
 
 

 
1992 films
1990s sports comedy-drama films
Walt Disney Pictures films
Films directed by Stephen Herek
Films set in Minnesota
Children's comedy-drama films
American ice hockey films
Films scored by David Newman
American children's comedy films
American sports comedy-drama films
Films with screenplays by Steven Brill
Films shot in Minnesota
1990s English-language films
1990s American films